Brook Forest is an unincorporated community and a census-designated place (CDP) located in and governed by Jefferson and Clear Creek counties, Colorado, United States. The CDP is a part of the Denver–Aurora–Lakewood, CO Metropolitan Statistical Area. The Evergreen Post Office (ZIP Code 80439) serves the area.



Geography

Demographics

See also

Outline of Colorado
Index of Colorado-related articles
State of Colorado
Colorado cities and towns
Colorado census designated places
Colorado counties
Jefferson County, Colorado
Clear Creek County, Colorado
Colorado metropolitan areas
Front Range Urban Corridor
North Central Colorado Urban Area
Denver-Aurora-Boulder, CO Combined Statistical Area
Denver-Aurora-Broomfield, CO Metropolitan Statistical Area

References

External links

Brook Forest Inn @ History Colorado
Brook Forest Inn @ RockyMountainParanormal.com
The Brook Forest Inn - Ghosts, Germans and Gold
Jefferson County website
Clear Creek County website

Census-designated places in Jefferson County, Colorado
Census-designated places in Clear Creek County, Colorado
Census-designated places in Colorado
Denver metropolitan area